USS Paul F. Foster (DD-964), named for Vice Admiral Paul F. Foster USN (1889–1972), is a  built by the Ingalls Shipbuilding Division of Litton Industries at Pascagoula, Mississippi. She was commissioned on 21 February 1976 and decommissioned on 27 March 2003. She is now ex-Paul F. Foster, serving as a Self Defense Test Ship for experimental U.S. Navy weapons and sensors.

History 
As the initial Spruance-class destroyer assigned to the Pacific Fleet, Paul F. Foster had many milestone firsts, including successfully firing a NATO Sea Sparrow missile, demonstrating the feasibility of landing H-46 helicopters, and determining the operational limits of the SH-3 helicopter.

Operating out of San Diego, Paul F. Foster became the first Spruance-class destroyer to deploy to the Western Pacific in March 1978. The ship deployed again in 1979 and 1982, serving in the Indian Ocean and Western Pacific.

Paul F. Foster joined Destroyer Squadron Nine and moved to its new home port of Long Beach, California, in August 1983. She became the Navy's first "all electric destroyer" after major modifications at Long Beach Naval Shipyard, which included the addition of a fourth ship's service gas turbine generator.

On 29 August 1984, Paul F. Foster began its fourth Western Pacific deployment as Destroyer Squadron Nine's flagship, with then Desron Nine Commodore, T.O. Gabriel and his staff embarked aboard, leading a five-ship surface action group and participating in several major allied fleet exercises.

During a fifth deployment beginning in August 1986 with Desron Nine as part of the  Battle Group, Paul F. Foster was awarded the Meritorious Unit Commendation for her performance in Operation Kernel Potlatch in the North Pacific and Bering Sea.

From July 1987 through July 1988, Paul F. Foster completed a regular overhaul at Northwest Marine Iron Works in Portland, Oregon. During the overhaul the ship received over 55 major ship alterations, including installation of the Mk 41 Vertical Launch System for Tomahawk cruise missiles, the AN/SQQ-89 Anti-Submarine Warfare Detection System, and facilities to employ the Navy's most sophisticated submarine helicopter, the LAMPS MkIII.

Paul F. Foster departed on its sixth Western Pacific/Indian Ocean deployment on 24 February 1989 in company with the  Battle Group. Conducting operations in the northern Arabian Sea, she was awarded the Armed Forces Expeditionary Medal.

1990 to 2003 
On 8 December 1990, Paul F. Foster departed Long Beach on its seventh overseas deployment to the Persian Gulf in support of Operations Desert Shield and Desert Storm.  The first ship to fire Tomahawk missiles against Iraqi targets from the Persian Gulf, she was instrumental in the liberation of Kuwait and in winning the campaign. Deploying for the eighth time on 20 July 1992, she returned to the Arabian Sea, where she operated in support of Persian Gulf Operations-Southern Watch while participating in numerous bilateral exercises with Persian Gulf Nations.

During the ship's ninth deployment, Paul F. Foster again served with the Carl Vinson Carrier Battle Group and was the first ship on the scene to provide assistance to a burning ocean tug, Glorious City, putting out the fire and saving its crew of seven.

Upon returning from deployment on 20 October 1994, Paul F. Foster entered into a regular overhaul at Long Beach Naval Shipyard where several of the latest technological weapons, sensors and engineering systems were added. A major change implemented during this overhaul was a retrofit of a berthing, to accommodate her first female crew members. After completion of overhaul, she moved to her new home port of Everett, Washington arriving November 1995.

During the ship's tenth deployment which began 21 February 1997, Paul F. Foster was a part of the multinational force during Persian Gulf Operations, enforcing United Nations sanctions against Iraq.

Paul F. Foster departed for her eleventh deployment on 27 January 1999. While serving as part of the Pacific Middle East Force, she participated in Operation Iron Siren, Eager Sentry, and Arabian Gauntlet. In addition, the ship conducted boarding's in support of United Nations sanctions against Iraq.

Paul F. Foster departed for her twelfth deployment on 11 January 2001, where the ship once again conducted numerous boarding operations in support of the United Nations sanctions against Iraq. Her thirteenth and final deployment began on 18 June 2002.

Decommissioning and Self Defense Test Ship role 

Paul F. Foster was decommissioned on 27 March 2003. In 2004, Paul F. Foster was designated to replace ex- as a test ship for the Navy, a role she assumed in 2005. In support of this new role, the now ex-Paul F. Foster was assigned to Naval Surface Warfare Center, Port Hueneme Division. She is the only ship of her class that exists as of 2019, as all of her sister ships were either scrapped or sunk as targets upon decommissioning. 

On 8 April 2011, Wired.com reported that ex-Paul F. Foster had successfully used the Maritime Laser Demonstrator for the first time in a sea-to-sea target test, sinking a small inflatable motorboat at a range of one mile in rough seas.

On 17 November 2011, ex-Paul F. Foster demonstrated the use of shipboard alternative fuel, while underway in the Pacific Ocean on a 50–50 blend of an algae-derived, hydro-processed algal oil and petroleum F-76. The ship arrived Thursday morning to the Naval Surface Warfare Center at Port Hueneme in Southern California after traveling for 17 hours on a maiden trip from San Diego.

On 18 July 2016, ex-Paul F. Foster performed a test launch of the LRASM Anti-ship missile from her Mark 41 Vertical Launching System while underway in the Pacific Ocean.

Gallery

Awards 
According to the Navy unit Awards site, Paul F. Foster received the following awards:
 Navy Expeditionary Medal, 6 March 1980 to 31 March 1980 for Iran / Indian Ocean.
 Meritorious Unit Citation, 16 January 1987 to 2 February 1987.
 Armed Forces Expeditionary Medal, 22 April 1989 to 4 May 1989, for Persian Gulf and 22 May 1989 to 15 June 1989.
 Navy Unit Commendation, 17 January 1991 to 7 February 1991, for Desert Storm.
 Combat Action Ribbon, 17 January 1991 to 28 February 1991, for Desert Storm.
 Southwest Asia Service Medal, 13 January 1991 to 19 April 1991.
 Armed Forces Expeditionary Medal, 3 April 1997 to 30 to June 1997, for Bosnia.
 Armed Forces Expeditionary Medal, 18 April 1999 to 17 July 1999, for Bosnia.
 Armed Forces Expeditionary Medal, 28 February 2001 to 6 May 2001, for Bosnia.
 Navy E Ribbon, 3 awards, 1 July 1977 to 31 December 1978, 1 January 1991 to 31 December 1992 and 1 January 2002 to 31 December 2002.

See also 
 List of destroyers of the United States Navy

References

External links 

 

 

Spruance-class destroyers
Cold War destroyers of the United States
Gulf War ships of the United States
1974 ships